JCJ may refer to:

 J. C. J. Kimaro, commander of the Kenyan Navy
 JCJ Architecture, formerly Jeter, Cook & Jepson, an architecture firm; see Foxwoods Resort Casino
 JCJ Vanderheyden (1928–2012), Dutch painter and photographer
 Journal of Criminal Justice, a bimonthly peer-reviewed academic journal